In Western culture, a black armband signifies that the wearer is in mourning or wishes to identify with the commemoration of a family member, friend, comrade or team member who has died. This use is particularly common in the first meeting following the loss of a member. In sport, especially association football and cricket, players will often wear black armbands following the death of former player or manager.

Black armbands are also worn by uniformed organisations, such as the police, fire services or military, at the funeral of a comrade or on the death of a sovereign.

Historical examples

See also
21-gun salute
Ten-bell salute
Three-volley salute
Tinker v. Des Moines Independent Community School District

References

Armbands
Acknowledgements of death